Giordana is an Italian surname. Notable people with the surname include:

Andrea Giordana (born 1946), Italian singer and actor
Marina Giordana (born 1955), Italian actress
Marco Tullio Giordana (born 1950), Italian film director and screenwriter

Italian-language surnames